Gerdau is a surname. Notable people with the surname include:

André Bier Gerdau Johannpeter (born 1963), Brazilian businessman and equestrian
Jorge Gerdau Johannpeter (born 1936), Brazilian businessman and equestrian
Mats Gerdau (born 1964), Swedish politician
Willi Gerdau (1929–2011), German footballer